Irkham Zahrul Mila (born 2 May 1998) is an Indonesian professional footballer who plays as a winger for Liga 1 club PSS Sleman.

Club career

PSS Sleman
Mila explored footballing opportunities in the lower leagues before he joined PSS Sleman in 2018 when the club was striving to return to top-flight football after a decade in tier-two. He was part of the PSS team that won the 2018 Liga 2 and earned promotion to Liga 1 (Indonesia). His performance in PSS led to calls to the Indonesia U-23 team that eventually won silver in the 2019 Southeast Asian Games.

On 5 September 2021, Mila scored his first goal of the 2021–22 season, scoring in a 1–1 draw over Persija Jakarta in the 2021–22 Liga 1.

Honours

Club
PSS Sleman
 Liga 2: 2018
Menpora Cup third place: 2021

International
Indonesia U23
 Southeast Asian Games  Silver medal: 2019

References

External links
 Irkham Mila at Soccerway
 Irkham Mila at Liga Indonesia

1998 births
Living people
Indonesian footballers
Liga 2 (Indonesia) players
Liga 1 (Indonesia) players
Persis Solo players
PSS Sleman players
Association football wingers
Indonesia youth international footballers
Competitors at the 2019 Southeast Asian Games
Southeast Asian Games silver medalists for Indonesia
Southeast Asian Games medalists in football
People from Tegal
Sportspeople from Central Java